Nepenthes rafflesiana (after Stamford Raffles), or Raffles' pitcher-plant, is a species of tropical pitcher plant. It has a very wide distribution covering Borneo, Sumatra, Peninsular Malaysia, and Singapore. Nepenthes rafflesiana is extremely variable, with numerous forms and varieties described. In Borneo alone, there are at least three distinct varieties. The giant form of this species produces enormous pitchers rivalling those of N. rajah in size.

Distribution and habitat

Nepenthes rafflesiana is a widespread lowland species. It is common in Borneo and parts of the Riau Archipelago, but has a restricted distribution in both Peninsular Malaysia and Sumatra. It is only widespread in the southeastern region of the Malay Peninsula, particularly in the state of Johor, where it is relatively abundant. Nepenthes rafflesiana has only been recorded from the west coast of Sumatra, between Indrapura and Barus. It is also found in Singapore and on a number of smaller islands, including Bangka, Labuan, Natuna, and the Lingga Islands.

Nepenthes rafflesiana generally occurs in open, sandy, wet areas. It has been recorded from kerangas forest, secondary formations, margins of peat swamp forest, heath forest, and seaside cliffs. It grows at elevations ranging from sea-level to 1200 m or even 1500 m.

Description

Nepenthes rafflesiana is a scrambling vine. The stem may climb to a height of 15 m and is up to 10 mm thick. Internodes are up to 20 cm long. Tendrils may be over 110 cm long.

The lower pitchers of N. rafflesiana are bulbous and possess well-developed fringed wings. These terrestrial traps rarely exceed 20 cm in height, although the giant form of N. rafflesiana is known produce pitchers up to 35 cm long and 15 cm wide. Upper pitchers are funnel-shaped and often bear a distinctive raised section at the front of the peristome. Both types of pitchers have a characteristically elongated peristome neck that may be 3 cm or more in length.

Pitcher colouration varies greatly from dark purple to almost completely white. The typical form of N. rafflesiana is light green throughout with heavy purple blotches on the lower pitchers and cream-coloured aerial pitchers.

The inflorescence is a raceme and grows between 16 and 70 cm tall. The red or purple flowers usually occur singly, or sometimes in pairs, on each flower-stalk.

Young plants are wholly covered with long, caducous, brown or white hairs. Mature plants often have a sparse indumentum of short, brown hairs, though they may be completely glabrous.

Biology

Nepenthes rafflesiana is found in tropical lowlands. It produces two distinct types of pitchers (heavily modified leaves), which are used to capture and kill insect prey for nutrients. The lower pitchers are generally round, squat and 'winged', while the upper pitchers are more narrow at their base. The species is widely variable and comes in a variety of shapes and colors – most contain varying amounts of green, white, and maroon streaks.

All Nepenthes are passive carnivores with no moving parts, unlike their distant cousins the Venus flytrap. Nepenthes rafflesiana kills by luring its prey into its pitchers, whose peristomes secrete a sweet-tasting nectar. Once the insect is inside, it quickly finds the walls of the pitcher too slippery to scale and drowns. Digestive enzymes released by the plant into the liquid break down the prey and release soluble nutrients, which are absorbed by the plant through the walls of the pitcher. The carnivorous nature of Nepenthes is supposedly a consequence of living in nutrient-poor soils; since the main method of nutrient absorption in most plants (the root) is insufficient in these soils, the plants have evolved other ways to gain nutrients. As a result, the roots of Nepenthes and most other carnivorous plants are slight and fragile; hence care must be taken when repotting. All Nepenthes are dioecious, meaning that each individual plant has only male or female characteristics.

For Nepenthes pitchers being used as daytime roosting sleeping bags by small bats, see Nepenthes hemsleyana#Relationship with bats.

Discovery and early history

Nepenthes rafflesiana was discovered by Dr. William Jack in 1819. In a letter from Singapore published in Curtis's Botanical Magazine, Jack wrote the following account:

It is impossible to conceive anything more beautiful than the approach to Singapore, through the Archipelago of islands that lie at the extremity of the Straits of Malacca. Seas of glass wind among innumerable islets, clothed in all the luxuriance of tropical vegetation and basking in the full brilliance of a tropical sky... I have just arrived in time to explore the woods before they yield to the axe, and have made many interesting discoveries, particularly of two new and splendid species of pitcher-plant [Nepenthes rafflesiana and Nepenthes ampullaria], far surpassing any yet known in Europe. I have completed two perfect drawings of them with ample descriptions. Sir S. Raffles is anxious that we should give publicity to our researches in one way or other and has planned bringing out something at Bencoolen. He proposes sending home these pitcher-plants that such splendid things may appear under all the advantages of elegant execution, by way of attracting attention to the subject of Sumatran botany.

At the time the largest known species in the genus, N. rafflesiana was described in the Gardener's and Farmer's Journal for 1850 as follows:

Whoever has seen this plant in a living state must undoubted be constrained to consider it as one of the most astonishing productions of the whole vegetable kingdom. The resemblance that a portion of it bears to our more familiar domestic utensils leaves a lasting impression on the minds of spectators that is not easily eradicated; it is the largest and most magnificent of the genus, far surpassing any hitherto known in Europe.

Cultivation

Nepenthes rafflesiana is very popular in cultivation; it is a lowland Nepenthes (enjoying hot, humid conditions most of the time, as found in tropical jungle lowlands) but can be grown as an intermediate, with cooler nights and less humidity. It is a comparatively hardy Nepenthes that is commonly recommended as a "first plant" to new Nepenthes growers. The plant should be grown in shaded conditions, diffuse sunlight, or in a large grow chamber under artificial lights. Watering and misting should be performed frequently, and preferably with distilled water, to avoid mineral build-up that is not only unsightly but that may damage the delicate roots of Nepenthes (and most other carnivorous plants). Standing water is inadvisable. A wet, well-draining potting medium is a necessity. Methods of feeding are varied – some growers feed freeze-dried bloodworms or Koi pellets (both available in the fish section of most pet stores); others prefer orchid mixes. No carnivorous plant should ever be fed mammalian meat – this will result not only in an unpleasant smell but also the probable rotting of the pitcher and potential death of the plant. The digestive enzymes present have not evolved to handle large prey items, and the rotting material gives opportunistic bacteria and fungi a chance to take hold.

Infraspecific taxa

Across its expansive range, N. rafflesiana exhibits great variability in both pitcher morphology and colour. The following infraspecific taxa of N. rafflesiana have appeared in the literature. Most of these are not considered valid today, and a number represent different taxa altogether. The elongate plant often referred to informally as N. rafflesiana var. elongata, and described as N. baramensis, is now known under the name N. hemsleyana.

Nepenthes rafflesiana f. alba Hort.Westphal (2000) nom.nud.
Nepenthes rafflesiana var. alata J.H.Adam & Wilcock (1990)
Nepenthes rafflesiana var. ambigua Beck (1895)
Nepenthes rafflesiana var. elongata Hort.Kew ex Dyer (1897) nom.nud. [=?N. hemsleyana]
Nepenthes rafflesiana var. excelsior (Hort.Williams) Beck (1895) [=(N. ampullaria × N. rafflesiana) × N. rafflesiana]
Nepenthes rafflesiana var. glaberrima Hook.f. (1873)
Nepenthes rafflesiana var. hookeriana (auct. non Low: Hort.Veitch ex Mast.) Becc. (1886) [=N. × hookeriana]
Nepenthes rafflesiana var. insignis Mast. (1882)
Nepenthes rafflesiana var. longicirrhosa Tamin & M.Hotta in M.Hotta (1986) nom.nud. [=N. longifolia]
Nepenthes rafflesiana var. minor Becc. (1886)
Nepenthes rafflesiana var. nigropurpurea Mast. (1882)
Nepenthes rafflesiana var. nivea Hook.f. (1873)
Nepenthes rafflesiana var. pallida Hort.Veitch ex Burb. (1883) [=(N. khasiana × N. gracilis) × N. rafflesiana]
Nepenthes rafflesiana var. striata Hort. ex Teijsm. (1859) nom.nud.
Nepenthes rafflesiana var. subglandulosa J.H.Adam & Hafiza (2006) [=N. hemsleyana]
Nepenthes rafflesiana var. typica Beck (1895) nom.illeg.
Nepenthes rafflesiana var. viridis Hort. ex Teijsm. (1859) nom.nud.
Nepenthes rafflesiana var. vittata Lauffenburger (1995) nom.nud.
Nepenthes rafflesiana "glaberrima" Burb. (1880) [=N. hemsleyana]

Giant form

Giant plants of N. rafflesiana have been recorded from a number of isolated localities on the northwestern coast of Borneo and one population has been found near the seaside town of Sematan, around 110 km west of Kuching. The typical habitat of this form is dense heath forest, especially around vegetation boundaries.

The giant form is a much larger plant than the typical form in all respects. The stem may climb to a height of 15 m. Leaf blades are around two and a half times as long as usual. Lower pitchers reach 35 cm in height by 15 cm in width and sometimes exceed 1 litre in volume, making them some of the largest in the genus. They vary widely in pigmentation, from white with red blotches to dark purple. Upper pitchers may be spotted or green throughout. The inflorescence is also massive, reaching over 1 m in length. The individual flowers measure up to 1.5 cm in diameter and have dark red tepals.

In addition to its size, the giant form is distinguished by the colour of its developing leaves, which have a bronze sheen. Both this characteristic and the plant's exceptional size are exhibited by cultivated specimens and thus they cannot be due to unusual environmental factors.

Natural hybrids
The following natural hybrids involving N. rafflesiana have been recorded.

N. albomarginata × N. rafflesiana
N. ampullaria × N. rafflesiana [=N. × hookeriana]
? (N. ampullaria × N. rafflesiana) × N. mirabilis [=N. × hookeriana × N. mirabilis]
N. bicalcarata × N. rafflesiana
? (N. bicalcarata × N. rafflesiana) × N. mirabilis var. echinostoma
N. clipeata × N. rafflesiana
N. gracilis × N. rafflesiana
N. hemsleyana × N. rafflesiana
N. mirabilis × N. rafflesiana (including N. mirabilis var. echinostoma × N. rafflesiana)

Conservation

Most wild populations of Nepenthes, including N. rafflesiana, are endangered due to habitat destruction and (to a lesser extent) poaching. N. rafflesiana is currently listed as a CITES Appendix II plant, so it does have some international trade restrictions (though not an outright ban). Today, most N. rafflesiana plants on the market are propagated by plant tissue culture or other forms of vegetative propagation. When purchasing any plant, especially those protected by CITES, it is important to ask the vendor about the plant's provenance.

References

Further reading

 [Anonymous] 1848. New garden plants, published in books. The Gardeners' Chronicle and Agricultural Gazette 1848(6): 87. 
 [Anonymous] 1881. Messrs. Veitch's Nepenthes-house. The Gardeners' Chronicle, new series, 16(410): 598–599.
 [Anonymous] 1883. Mr. A. E. Ratcliff's Nepenthes. The Gardeners' Chronicle 20(497): 18–19.
 [Anonymous] 1887. Nepenthes culture. The Gardeners' Chronicle, series 3, 2(41): 442–443.
 Adam, J.H. 1997.  Pertanika Journal of Tropical Agricultural Science 20(2–3): 121–134.
 Adam, J.H. & C.C. Wilcock 1999.  Pertanika Journal of Tropical Agricultural Science 22(1): 1–7.
 Adam, J.H., E.M. Nurulhuda, H. Abdul-Halim, O. Abdul-Rahim, A.H. Hafiza, G.K. Gopir, L.M. Pilik, R. Omar, M.B. Qasim, J. Salimon, S. Abdul-Rahim & M.M. Hanafiah 2005. Pitcher plants recorded from BRIS forest in Jambu Bongkok, Kuala Trengganu, Malaysia. Wetland Science 3(3): 183–189.
  Adam, J.H., J.N. Maisarah, A.T.S. Norhafizah, A.H. Hafiza, M.Y. Harun & O.A. Rahim et al. 2009. Ciri Tanih Pada Habitat Nepenthes (Nepenthaceae) di Padang Tujuh, Taman Negeri Endau-Rompin Pahang. [Soil Properties in Nepenthes (Nepenthaceae) Habitat at Padang Tujuh, Endau-Rompin State Park, Pahang.] In: J.H. Adam, G.M. Barzani & S. Zaini (eds.) Bio-Kejuruteraan and Kelestarian Ekosistem. [Bio-Engineering and Sustainable Ecosystem.] Kumpulan Penyelidikan Kesihatan Persekitaran, Pusat Penyelidikan Bukit Fraser and Universiti Kebangsaan, Malaysia. pp. 147–157.
 Adams, R.M. & G.W. Smith 1977. An S.E.M. survey of the five carnivorous pitcher plant genera. American Journal of Botany 64(3): 265–272. 
 Bauer, U., C. Willmes & W. Federle 2009. Effect of pitcher age on trapping efficiency and natural prey capture in carnivorous Nepenthes rafflesiana plants. Annals of Botany 103(8): 1219–1226. 
 Bauer, U., C.J. Clemente, T. Renner & W. Federle 2012. Form follows function: morphological diversification and alternative trapping strategies in carnivorous Nepenthes pitcher plants. Journal of Evolutionary Biology 25(1): 90–102. 
 Bauer, U., B. Di Giusto, J. Skepper, T.U. Grafe & W. Federle 2012. With a flick of the lid: a novel trapping mechanism in Nepenthes gracilis pitcher plants. PLoS ONE 7(6): e38951. 
 Beaman, J.H. & C. Anderson 2004. The Plants of Mount Kinabalu: 5. Dicotyledon Families Magnoliaceae to Winteraceae. Natural History Publications (Borneo), Kota Kinabalu.
 Benz, M.J., E.V. Gorb & S.N. Gorb 2012. Diversity of the slippery zone microstructure in pitchers of nine carnivorous Nepenthes taxa. Arthropod-Plant Interactions 6(1): 147–158. 
  Blume, C.L. 1852. Ord. Nepenthaceae. In: Museum Botanicum Lugduno-Batavum, sive stirpium exoticarum novarum vel minus cognitarum ex vivis aut siccis brevis expositio. Tom. II. Nr. 1. E.J. Brill, Lugduni-Batavorum. pp. 5–10.
 Bonhomme, V., H. Pelloux-Prayer, E. Jousselin, Y. Forterre, J.-J. Labat & L. Gaume 2011. Slippery or sticky? Functional diversity in the trapping strategy of Nepenthes carnivorous plants. New Phytologist 191(2): 545–554. 
 Brearley, F.Q. & M. Mansur 2012. Nutrient stoichiometry of Nepenthes species from a Bornean peat swamp forest. Carnivorous Plant Newsletter 41(3): 105–108.
 Cannon, J., V. Lojanapiwatna, C. Raston, W. Sinchai & A. White 1980. The Quinones of Nepenthes rafflesiana. The Crystal Structure of 2,5-Dihydroxy-3,8-dimethoxy-7-methylnaphtho-1,4-quinone (Nepenthone-E) and a Synthesis of 2,5-Dihydroxy-3-Methoxy-7-methylnaphtho-1,4-quinone (Nepenthone-C). Australian Journal of Chemistry 33(5): 1073–1093. 
 Chung, A.Y.C. 2006. Biodiversity and Conservation of The Meliau Range: A Rain Forest in Sabah's Ultramafic Belt. Natural History Publications (Borneo), Kota Kinabalu. .
 Di Giusto, B., V. Grosbois, E. Fargeas, D.J. Marshall & L. Gaume 2008. Contribution of pitcher fragrance and fluid viscosity to high prey diversity in a Nepenthes carnivorous plant from Borneo. Journal of Biosciences 33(1): 121–136. 
 Di Giusto, B., M. Guéroult, N. Rowe & L. Gaume 2009. Chapter 7: The Waxy Surface in Nepenthes Pitcher Plants: Variability, Adaptive Significance and Developmental Evolution. In: S.N. Gorb (ed.) Functional Surfaces in Biology: Adhesion Related Phenomena. Volume 2. Springer. pp. 183–204.
 Di Giusto, B., J.-M. Bessière, M. Guéroult, L.B.L. Lim, D.J. Marshall, M. Hossaert-McKey & L. Gaume 2010. Flower-scent mimicry masks a deadly trap in the carnivorous plant Nepenthes rafflesiana. Journal of Ecology 98(4): 845–856. 
 Dixon, W.E. 1889. Nepenthes. The Gardeners' Chronicle, series 3, 6(144): 354.
 Frazier, C.K. 2000. Reproductive isolating mechanisms and fitness among tropical pitcher plants (Nepenthes) and their hybrids. [video] The 3rd Conference of the International Carnivorous Plant Society, San Francisco, USA.
 Gaume, L. & Y. Forterre 2007. A viscoelastic deadly fluid in carnivorous pitcher plants. PLoS ONE 2(11): e1185. 
  Gaume, L. & Y. Forterre 2008. Un piège viscoélastique chez Nepenthes rafflesiana. Dionée 71: 28–32.
 Gaume, L. & B. Di Giusto 2009. Adaptive significance and ontogenetic variability of the waxy zone in Nepenthes rafflesiana. Annals of Botany 104(7): 1281–1291. 
  Gaume, L. N.d. Piège viscoélastique. [videos] UMR AMAP.
  Handayani, T. & Syamsuddin 1998. Nepenthes rafflesiana Jack. dan keturunannya. Warta Kebun Raya 2(3): 1–8.
  Handayani, T. 1999.  [Conservation of Nepenthes in Indonesian botanic gardens.] In: A. Mardiastuti, I. Sudirman, K.G. Wiryawan, L.I. Sudirman, M.P. Tampubolon, R. Megia & Y. Lestari (eds.) Prosiding II: Seminar Hasil-Hasil Penelitian Bidang Ilmu Hayat. Pusat Antar Universitas Ilmu Hayat IPB, Bogor. pp. 365–372.
 Handayani, T., D. Latifah & Dodo 2005. Diversity and growth behaviour of Nepenthes (pitcher plants) in Tanjung Puting National Park, Central Kalimantan Province. Biodiversitas 6(4): 248–252 .  Cover 
 Hansen, E. 2001. Where rocks sing, ants swim, and plants eat animals: finding members of the Nepenthes carnivorous plant family in Borneo. Discover 22(10): 60–68.
 Hernawati & P. Akhriadi 2006. A Field Guide to the Nepenthes of Sumatra. PILI-NGO Movement, Bogor.
 Hooker, J.D. 1859. XXXV. On the origin and development of the pitchers of Nepenthes, with an account of some new Bornean plants of that genus. The Transactions of the Linnean Society of London 22(4): 415–424. 
 Hwee, K.C. 1996. Carnivorous plants and sites in Singapore. Bulletin of the Australian Carnivorous Plant Society, Inc. 15(4): 12–15.
 Kitching, R.L. 2000. Food Webs and Container Habitats: The natural history and ecology of phytotelmata. Cambridge University Press, Cambridge.
 Korthals, P.W. 1839. Over het geslacht Nepenthes. In: C.J. Temminck 1839–1842. Verhandelingen over de Natuurlijke Geschiedenis der Nederlandsche overzeesche bezittingen; Kruidkunde. Leiden. pp. 1–44, t. 1–4, 13–15, 20–22.
 Kurup, R., A.J. Johnson, S. Sankar, A.A. Hussain, C.S. Kumar & S. Baby 2013. Fluorescent prey traps in carnivorous plants. Plant Biology 15(3): 611–615. 
 Lecoufle, M. 1990. Nepenthes rafflesiana. In: Carnivorous Plants: Care and Cultivation. Blandford, London. pp. 136–137.
 Lee, C.C. 2000. Recent Nepenthes Discoveries. [video] The 3rd Conference of the International Carnivorous Plant Society, San Francisco, USA.
 Lim, S.H., D.C.Y. Phua & H.T.W. Tan 2000. Primer design and optimization for RAPD analysis of Nepenthes. Biologia Plantarum 43(1): 153–155. 
 Lindley, J. 1849. Familiar botany. — The pitcher plant. The Gardeners' Chronicle and Agricultural Gazette 1849(37): 580–581.
 Macfarlane, J.M. 1914. Family XCVI. Nepenthaceæ. [pp. 279–288] In: J.S. Gamble. Materials for a flora of the Malayan Peninsula, No. 24. Journal & Proceedings of the Asiatic Society of Bengal 75(3): 279–391.
  Mansur, M. 2001.  In: Prosiding Seminar Hari Cinta Puspa dan Satwa Nasional. Lembaga Ilmu Pengetahuan Indonesia, Bogor. pp. 244–253.
  Mansur, M. 2007. Keanekaragaman jenis Nepenthes (kantong semar) dataran rendah di Kalimantan Tengah. [Diversity of lowland Nepenthes (kantong semar) in Central Kalimantan.] Berita Biologi 8(5): 335–341. Abstract
  Mansur, M. 2008. Penelitian ekologi Nepenthes di Laboratorium Alam Hutan Gambut Sabangau Kereng Bangkirai Kalimantan Tengah. [Ecological studies on Nepenthes at Peat Swamps Forest Natural Laboratory, Kereng Bangkirai Sabangau, Central Kalimantan.] Jurnal Teknologi Lingkungan 9(1): 67–73. Abstract 
 Mansur, M. & F.Q. Brearley 2008. Ecological studies on Nepenthes at Barito Ulu, Central Kalimantan, Indonesia. Jurnal Teknologi Lingkungan 9(3): 271–276.
 Merbach, M.A., G. Zizka, B. Fiala, U. Maschwitz & W.E. Booth 2001. Patterns of nectar secretion in five Nepenthes species from Brunei Darussalam, Northwest Borneo, and implications for ant-plant relationships. Flora 196: 153–160. 
 Moore, D. 1872. On the culture of Nepenthes at Glasnevin. The Gardeners' Chronicle and Agricultural Gazette 1872(11): 359–360.
 Masters, M.T. 1872. The cultivated species of Nepenthes. The Gardeners' Chronicle and Agricultural Gazette 1872(16): 540–542.
 McPherson, S.R. & A. Robinson 2012. Field Guide to the Pitcher Plants of Borneo. Redfern Natural History Productions, Poole.
 McPherson, S.R. & A. Robinson 2012. Field Guide to the Pitcher Plants of Peninsular Malaysia and Indochina. Redfern Natural History Productions, Poole.
 McPherson, S.R. & A. Robinson 2012. Field Guide to the Pitcher Plants of Sumatra and Java. Redfern Natural History Productions, Poole.
 Meimberg, H., A. Wistuba, P. Dittrich & G. Heubl 2001. Molecular phylogeny of Nepenthaceae based on cladistic analysis of plastid trnK intron sequence data. Plant Biology 3(2): 164–175. 
  Meimberg, H. 2002.  Ph.D. thesis, Ludwig Maximilian University of Munich, Munich.
 Meimberg, H. & G. Heubl 2006. Introduction of a nuclear marker for phylogenetic analysis of Nepenthaceae. Plant Biology 8(6): 831–840. 
 Meimberg, H., S. Thalhammer, A. Brachmann & G. Heubl 2006. Comparative analysis of a translocated copy of the trnK intron in carnivorous family Nepenthaceae. Molecular Phylogenetics and Evolution 39(2): 478–490. 
 Mogi, M. & K.L. Chan 1997. Variation in communities of dipterans in Nepenthes pitchers in Singapore: Predators increase prey community diversity. Annals of the Entomological Society of America 90(2): 177–183.
 Moran, J.A. 1991. The role and mechanism of Nepenthes rafflesiana pitchers as insect traps in Brunei. Ph.D. thesis, University of Aberdeen, Aberdeen, Scotland.
 Moran, J.A. 1993. Visitors to the flowers of the pitcher plant Nepenthes rafflesiana. Brunei Museum Journal 8: 73–75.
 Moran, J.A. 1993. Pitcher allocation strategy of the pitcher plant Nepenthes rafflesiana. Brunei Museum Journal 8: 77–80.
 Moran, J.A. 1993. The effect of pitcher wing removal on prey capture by the pitcher plant Nepenthes rafflesiana. Brunei Museum Journal 8: 81–82.
 Moran, J.A. 1993. Misumenops nepenthicola: the top aquatic predator of the Nepenthes food web? Brunei Museum Journal 8: 83–84.
 Moran, J.A. 1996. Pitcher dimorphism, prey composition and the mechanisms of prey attraction in the pitcher plant Nepenthes rafflesiana in Borneo. Journal of Ecology 84(4): 515–525. 
 Moran, J.A. & A.J. Moran 1998. Foliar Reflectance and Vector Analysis Reveal Nutrient Stress in Prey-Deprived Pitcher Plants (Nepenthes rafflesiana). International Journal of Plant Sciences 159(6): 996–1001. 
 Moran, J.A., W.E. Booth & J.K. Charles 1999.  Annals of Botany 83: 521–528.
 Moran, J.A., M.A. Merbach, N.J. Livingston, C.M. Clarke & W.E. Booth 2001. Termite prey specialization in the pitcher plant Nepenthes albomarginata—evidence from stable isotope analysis. Annals of Botany 88: 307–311. 
 Moran, J.A., B.J. Hawkins, B.E. Gowen & S.L. Robbins 2010. Ion fluxes across the pitcher walls of three Bornean Nepenthes pitcher plant species: flux rates and gland distribution patterns reflect nitrogen sequestration strategies. Journal of Experimental Botany 61(5): 1365–1374. 
 Mullins, J. & M. Jebb 2009. Phylogeny and biogeography of the genus Nepenthes. National Botanic Gardens, Glasnevin. 
  Murniati, Syamswisna & A. Nurdini 2013. Pembuatan flash card dari hasil inventarisasi Nepenthes di hutan adat desa Teluk Bakung. Jurnal Pendidikan dan Pembelajaran 2(1): [unpaginated; 14 pp.] Abstract 
  Oikawa, T. 1992. Nepenthes rafflesiana Jack. In: . [The Grief Vanishing.] Parco Co., Japan. pp. 52–53.
 Osunkoya, O.O., S.D. Daud & F.L. Wimmer 2008. Longevity, lignin content and construction cost of the assimilatory organs of Nepenthes species. Annals of Botany 102(5): 845–853. 
 Reiskind, J. 1978.  Carnivorous Plant Newsletter 7(3): 77–78.
 Renner, T. & C.D. Specht 2011. A sticky situation: assessing adaptations for plant carnivory in the Caryophyllales by means of stochastic character mapping. International Journal of Plant Sciences 172(7): 889–901. 
 Rizzacasa, M.A. & M.V. Sargent 1987. The structure and synthesis of nepenthone-A, a naphthoquinone from Nepenthes rafflesiana.  Journal of the Chemical Society, Perkin Transactions 1: 2017–2022. 
 Robinson, A. 1995 ['1994/95']. Plant findings in Malaysia. The Carnivorous Plant Society Journal 18: 44–47.
 Rottloff, S., R. Stieber, H. Maischak, F.G. Turini, G. Heubl & A. Mithöfer 2011. Functional characterization of a class III acid endochitinase from the traps of the carnivorous pitcher plant genus, Nepenthes. Journal of Experimental Botany 62(13): 4639–4647. 
 Ruxton, G.D. & H.M. Schaefer 2011. Alternative explanations for apparent mimicry. Journal of Ecology 99(4): 899–904. 
  Schmid-Hollinger, R. N.d. Kannendeckel (lid). bio-schmidhol.ch. 
 Shivas, R.G. 1984. Pitcher Plants of Peninsular Malaysia & Singapore. Maruzen Asia, Kuala Lumpur.
 Slack, A. 1979. Nepenthes rafflesiana. In: Carnivorous Plants. Ebury Press, London. p. 82.
 Smythies, B.E. 1965. The distribution and ecology of pitcher-plants (Nepenthes) in Sarawak. UNESCO Humid Tropics Symposium, June–July 1963, Kuching, Sarawak.
  Sukmadijaya, D., D. Dinarti & Y. Isnaini 2010.  Bogor Agricultural University, Bogor.
  Syamsuardi & R. Tamin 1994. Kajian kekerabatan jenis-jenis Nepenthes di Sumatera Barat. Project report, Andalas University, Padang. Abstract 
  Syamsuardi 1995. Klasifikasi numerik kantong semar (Nepenthes) di Sumatera Barat. [Numerical classification of pitcher plants (Nepenthes) in West Sumatra.] Journal Matematika dan Pengetahuan Alam 4(1): 48–57. Abstract 
 Teo, L.L. 2001. Study of natural hybridisation in some tropical plants using amplified fragment length polymorphism analysis. M.Sc. thesis, Nanyang Technological University, Singapore.
 Teo, W.M.S. 2010. Photosynthetic characteristics and nitrogen metabolism of Nepenthes rafflesiana at two different growth stages in response to inorganic nitrate and organic prey. M.Sc. thesis, Nanyang Technological University, Singapore.
 Thorogood, C. 2010. The Malaysian Nepenthes: Evolutionary and Taxonomic Perspectives. Nova Science Publishers, New York.
 Torres-Rivera, J.J. 2007. A case of Nepenthes rafflesiana with a lotus-like flower! Carnivorous Plant Newsletter 36(3): 81–82.
  Uji, T. 2003. Keanekaragaman dan potensi flora di Cagar Alam Muara Kendawangan, Kalimantan Barat. [Flora diversity and its potential in Muara Kendawangan Nature Reserve, West Kalimantan.] Biodiversitas 4(1): 112–117. 
  Yogiara 2004.  M.Sc. thesis, Bogor Agricultural University, Bogor.
 Yogiara, A. Suwanto & M.T. Suhartono 2006. A complex bacterial community living in pitcher plant fluid. Jurnal Mikrobiologi Indonesia 11(1): 9–14.
 Zulaiha Shireen bte Mohd Salleh 2009. Carbon and nitrogen metabolism and mineral nutrition of carnivorous pitcher plants under greenhouse conditions. M.Sc. thesis, Nanyang Technological University, Singapore.
 James Wong and the Malaysian Garden. [video] BBC Two.

Carnivorous plants of Asia
rafflesiana
Flora of Borneo
Flora of Malaya
Flora of Sumatra
Plants described in 1835